The School of Geography and the Environment (SoGE) is a department of the University of Oxford in England, which is part of the university's Social Sciences Division. It is located in the Oxford University Centre for the Environment on South Parks Road, in central Oxford.

The department is well known for its research-based curriculum.

SoGE has a unique academic curriculum. The curriculum of an undergraduate student consists of both physical and human geography as well as GIS and cartography. It focuses on both physical and human geography while giving the opportunity to specialize in a particular topic.

SoGE houses three research centres: the Environmental Change Institute (ECI), the Smith School of Enterprise and the Environment (SSEE), and the Transport Studies Unit (TSU).

History 
In 1887, Halford John Mackinder was appointed as the university's first lecturer in geography. The School of Geography (as it was then known) was established in 1899.

Initially, the School was housed on the upper floor of the Old Ashmolean building, but it outgrew these premises and began renting temporary rooms on Broad Street in 1909. In 1910 it moved into part of Acland House in Broad Street. In 1922 the School moved to Holywell House on Mansfield Road. In 2009, it was renamed as the School of Geography and the Environment.British Geography played quite an important role exploring and documenting the different parts of the earth surface.

References

External links
 School of Geography and the Environment website

Departments of the University of Oxford
Geography departments in the United Kingdom
Educational institutions established in 1899
1899 establishments in England